wkw/tk/1996@7′55″hk.net is a 1996 commercial short film by Hong Kong director Wong Kar-wai that he made for Japanese fashion designer Takeo Kikuchi. The title contains the initials of Wong Kar-wai and Takeo Kikuchi, the year of release, the length, 7 minutes 55 seconds, and "hk" for Hong Kong.

It features Japanese actor Tadanobu Asano and Hong Kong actress Karen Mok. Photography is by Wong's stock cinematographer, Australian expatriate Christopher Doyle. The film is very much in keeping with Wong's style. There are several versions of the film, originally two otherwise identical versions were released with different soundtracks to lay emphasis on the perspectives of the male and female character respectively. There are several versions of the film that have been aired as television commercials. These are available on the Japanese laserdisc release of Wong's Fallen Angels (1995), as well as various bootlegged VCD releases of Wong's features.

External links

 yeseule.net/wkwtk.htm Website with poster - dead link
Art of Europe info
JMDb entry (Japanese)

1996 films
1990s Japanese-language films
1996 short films
Short films directed by Wong Kar-wai
Japanese short films
1990s Japanese films